Yung Chang is a Chinese Canadian film director and was part of the collective member directors of Canadian film production firm EyeSteelFilm.

Chang is a graduate of Concordia University's Mel Hoppenheim School of Cinema in Montreal (BFA 99), the Neighbourhood Playhouse School of the Theatre (2003), the Canadian Film Center (2009), and the Directors and Screenwriters Lab at the Sundance Institute (2015). He was invited to join the Academy of Motion Picture Arts and Sciences in 2013 and is currently an active member.

Early life 
Chang grew up in Whitby, Ontario as one of few children of color. He was later sent to boarding school at Upper Canada College.

Career

Documentary 
Chang released the medium length documentary, Earth to Mouth, in 2002 with the National Film Board of Canada. It revolves around migrant Mexican worker working on a Chinese operated farm in south-east Ontario.

Chang released his first feature length documentary, Up the Yangtze in 2007. The film highlights the repercussions of building the Three Gorges Dam and the economic effect on rural families.  It was one of the top-grossing documentary box office releases in 2008 and garnered numerous awards, including the 2008 Golden Horse Award for Best Documentary.

Chang released his sophomore film, China Heavyweight, in 2012. It is about a boxing coach and his two students in rural China fighting to become amateur and professional champions. The film premiered at Sundance 2012 in the World Documentary competition. Like its predecessor, China Heavyweight also won the Golden Horse Award for Best Documentary in 2012.

In the same year, Chang also completed The Fruit Hunters, a feature documentary about exotic fruit cultivators, preservationists, and the history of fruits. The Fruit Hunters premiered at the International Documentary Festival (IDFA) in Amsterdam and the Berlinale Film Festival in 2013. It won the Best Film award at the 2013 Environmental Film Festival in Paris.

His documentary short, Gatekeeper, was released in 2016 and is streaming on Field of Vision, Laura Poitras' curated online film unit. It centers around retired police officer, Yukio Shige, and his work on preventing suicides around Tōjinbō, an infamous location for suicides in Japan. Gatekeeper won Best Short Documentary at the LA Film Festival in 2016, qualifying for the Oscars.

This is Not a Movie, his feature documentary about prolific Middle East correspondent, Robert Fisk, had its world premiere at the 2019 Toronto International Film Festival. It was co-produced by the National Film Board of Canada and is distributed in the USA by KimStim Films.

Chang released Pandemic19 co-directed with his wife, Annie Katsura Rollins, executive produced by Jean Tsien, edited by Xi Feng and lensed by Derek Howard. The film won two awards at the 2020 Hot Springs Documentary Film Festival for Best Documentary Short Special Jury Mention and the Matt DeCample Audience Choice Award Short. The jury wrote: "PANDEMIC19 is a poignant document of the factual and emotional details of Covid-19 as seen through the eyes of three American frontline doctors. Smartly utilizing the doctors own video testimonials, this film feels alive and immediate while we remain so disconnected."

Narrative 
Chang wrote the neo-noir romantic screenplay for Eggplant《茄子》, his first narrative feature, about a wedding photographer's happenstance encounter with his swindler ex-girlfriend. The project was selected to participate in the Sundance Institute Director and Screenwriters Lab in 2015.

Influences 
Chang is a fan of cinéma vérité, taking influences from films released by the National Film Board of Canada in the 1950s and 1960s, such as Lonely Boy (film), and Allan King's "actuality drama" filmography.

Filmography

Director
2002: The Fish Market (short)
2003: Earth to Mouth (short documentary)
2007: Up the Yangtze (full-length documentary)
 2009: Ali Shan (short)
2012: China Heavyweight (full-length documentary)
2012: The Fruit Hunters (full-length documentary)
2016: Gatekeeper (documentary)
2017: Eggplant (script)
2019: Omega Man: A Wrestling Love Story (documentary) 
2019: This Is Not a Movie (documentary)
2021: Wuhan Wuhan (documentary)

Screenwriter
2002: The Fish Market (short)
2007: Up the Yangtze
2009: Ali Shan (short)
2012: China Heavyweight 
2012: The Fruit Hunters
2016: Gatekeeper (short)
2017: Eggplant (script)

Screenings and awards
Yung Chang is also the recipient of the 2008 Yolande and Pierre Perrault award for most promising filmmaker at the 2008 Rendez-vous du cinema québecois; received the 2008 Don Haig Award at Hot Docs; and the Charles Guggenheim Emerging Artist Award at Full Frame Documentary Film Festival in North Carolina.

References

Up the Yangtze!, by John Anderson.
Director Yung Chang Interview / Q&A
Northwest Asian Weekly commentary/Yung Chang Interview
Indiewire interview with Yung Chang
New Zealand Scoop Video Interview with Yung Chang
PBS POV Interview with Yung Chang

External links
Official Website of Yung Chang

Films by Yung Chang at NFB.ca website
Yung Chang speaks with WSWS about Up the Yangtze, interview with Richard Phillips on the World Socialist Web Site

EyeSteelFilm
Concordia University alumni
Canadian people of Chinese descent
Canadian documentary film directors
Film directors from Montreal
Film directors from Ontario
Living people
Directors of Genie and Canadian Screen Award winners for Best Documentary Film
Asian-Canadian filmmakers
Upper Canada College alumni
Year of birth missing (living people)